Mortician is an American death metal band from Yonkers, New York, founded in 1989. They have released most of their albums since the House by the Cemetery EP on Relapse Records, but have released their latest album on their own label, Mortician Records. They have toured several times through America and Europe. The band is heavily inspired by horror movies, which is expressed in the lyrics, the artwork, and the use of samples throughout their discography.

Influences
Mortician is influenced by other seminal death metal and grindcore acts, chiefly Repulsion, Impetigo, and Autopsy, but also Massacre, Terrorizer, Incantation, Pungent Stench, Napalm Death, and Carcass.

Band members
Current
 Will Rahmer – bass, vocals (1989–present)
 Roger J. Beaujard – guitars (1991–present)
Sam Inzerra – drums (2003–present)

Former
Matthew David "Matt" Sicher – drums (1989–1991; died 1994)
John McEntee – guitars (1990)
Desmond Tolhurst – bass, guitars (1997–1999)
Kyle Powell – drums (1999)
Ron Kachnic – guitars (2000–2002)

Timeline

Discography

Albums
 Hacked Up for Barbecue (1997)
 Chainsaw Dismemberment (1999)
 Domain of Death (2001)
 Darkest Day of Horror (2003)
 Re-Animated Dead Flesh (2004)

EPs and singles
 Brutally Mutilated (7" Single, 1990)
 Mortal Massacre (7" Single, 1991)
 Mortal Massacre (EP, 1993)
 House by the Cemetery (7" Single, 1994)
 House by the Cemetery (EP, 1995)
 Zombie Apocalypse (7" Single, 1998)
 Zombie Apocalypse (EP, 1998)
 Living.../... Dead (Split with Fleshgrind, 2004)

Demos
 Rehearsal 12/14/89
 Demo No. 1 1990
 Mortician / Malignancy / Deathrune / Alive (4) – Yonkers Death (CD, Ltd) (2007)

Compilations
Gummo soundtrack ("Skin Peeler")
Traces of Death III: Dead and Buried soundtrack ("Traces of Death")
Straight to Hell: A Tribute to Slayer compilation ("Piece by Piece")
 Mortal Massacre
 Zombie Apocalypse/House by the Cemetery (Cass, Comp)
 Hacked Up for Barbecue/Zombie Apocalypse
 House by the Cemetery/Mortal Massacre
 Wizards of Gore: Tribute to Impetigo compilation ("Cannibal Lust") (2000, Razorback Recordings)
 Final Bloodbath Session (2002, Primitive Recordings)
 From the Casket (2016, Necroharmonic Productions)

Live albums
 Zombie Massacre Live! (2004)

Tribute albums
 Tribute to Mortician (2007)

References

External links
 

Death metal musical groups from New York (state)
Deathgrind musical groups
Goregrind musical groups
Heavy metal duos
Relapse Records artists
Musical groups established in 1989